Lugovoye is a rural locality (a selo) in Krasnogorsky District, Altai Krai, Russia. The population was 70 as of 2013. There is 1 street.

Geography 
Lugovoye is located on the Barda River, 9 km northwest of Krasnogorskoye (the district's administrative centre) by road. Manuilskoye is the nearest rural locality.

References 

Rural localities in Krasnogorsky District, Altai Krai